Utamysh (Ötemiş) is a rural locality (a selo) in Kayakentsky District, Republic of Dagestan, Russia. The population was 3,634 as of 2010. There are 32 streets.

Geography 
Utamysh is located 29 km northwest of Novokayakent (the district's administrative centre) by road. Myurego and Novye Mugri are the nearest rural localities.

Nationalities 
Kumyks live there.

References 

Rural localities in Kayakentsky District